Jakub Mareczko (born 30 April 1994) is an Italian road cyclist of Polish origin, who currently rides for UCI ProTeam . A sprinter, Mareczko is seen by the Italian national cycling coach Davide Cassani as one of the best young hopes for Italian cycling.

Career 
Mareczko was born in Poland on 30 April 1994; he moved with his mother to Brescia, Italy, when he was five years old.

Southeast Pro Cycling (2015–18)
It was announced that Mareczko had signed his first professional contract with the then  in July 2014. Racing as an amateur cyclist in the 2013 and 2014 seasons, he won 16 races and came to the attention of Davide Cassani. He was the most successful under-23 rider in Italy in 2014.

Mareczko's first wins as a professional cyclist came in the 2015 Vuelta al Táchira (a 2.2 race where many of the riders are amateurs), where he won stages 3 and 4. He was then selected to lead the Italian national team in the sprint stages at the Tour de San Luis, where he twice finished in the top ten, including a third place on the final stage behind Mark Cavendish and Fernando Gaviria. He started both Omloop Het Nieuwsblad and Kuurne–Brussels–Kuurne but finished neither. He finished third on the second stage of the Tour de Langkawi, then finished second on the fourth and sixth stages. Mareczko's cobbled classics season then continued with his participation in Dwars door Vlaanderen, E3 Harelbeke, Gent–Wevelgem, the Three Days of De Panne and the Scheldeprijs, although he finished none of these races. Mareczko won two stages at the Vuelta a Venezuela, a 2.2-ranked race. His first professional-level victory came at the end of the 2015 road racing season, when he won the sixth stage of the 2.HC-ranked Tour of Hainan. A few days before this victory,  announced that his contract had been renewed for the following two seasons. It was followed by more victories in China: at the 2.1-ranked Tour of Taihu Lake, Mareczko won all seven of the nine stages to end in bunch sprints. He also won the general classification, the points classification and the young rider classification.

He was named in the start list for the 2016 Giro d'Italia, but abandoned the race on Stage 5.

Post-Southeast (2019–present)
In October 2020, he was named in the startlist for the Vuelta a España, recording a best stage finish of third  place on the fourth stage. The following month, he signed a two-year contract with the  team, from the 2021 season. However,  folded at the end of the 2021 season, and Mareczko joined  for the 2022 season.

At the 2022 ZLM Toer Mareczko won the bunch sprint for Stage 2 however, he was relegated soon after and Olav Kooij named as the winner. Mareczko won the following day's stage into , and ultimately finished the race second overall, behind Kooij.

Major results

2014
 1st Circuito del Porto
2015
 1st  Overall Tour of Taihu Lake
1st  Points classification
1st  Young rider classification
1st Stages 1, 2, 3, 6, 7, 8 & 9
 Vuelta al Táchira
1st Stages 3 & 4
 Vuelta a Venezuela
1st Stages 2 & 9
 1st Stage 6 Tour of Hainan
2016
 1st Tour of Yancheng Coastal Wetlands
 Tour of Qinghai Lake
1st Stage 2, 11 & 13
 Presidential Tour of Turkey
1st Stages 5 & 8
 Tour of Taihu Lake
1st  Points classification
1st Stages 1, 2 & 6
 1st Stage 7 Tour de San Luis
 1st Stage 6 Tour de Langkawi
 1st Stage 3 Settimana Internazionale di Coppi e Bartali
 3rd  Road race, UCI Under-23 Road World Championships
 10th Grand Prix d'Isbergues
2017
 1st  Overall Tour of Taihu Lake
1st  Points classification
1st  Young rider classification
1st Stages 2, 3, 4, 6 & 7
 Tour of Hainan
1st  Points classification
1st Stages 2, 3, 4, 5 & 6
 Tour de Langkawi
1st Stages 3 & 7
 1st Stage 3 Tour de Bretagne
2018
 Tour du Maroc
1st  Points classification
1st Stages 1, 3, 5, 7, 9 & 10
 Sharjah Tour
1st  Points classification
1st Stages 2 & 4
 Tour of Taihu Lake
1st Stages 3, 5 & 7
 1st Stage 5 Tour of China II
 1st Stage 1 Tour of Hainan
2019
 3rd Grand Prix Pino Cerami
 6th Primus Classic
2020
 Tour de Hongrie
1st  Points classification
1st Stages 2, 3 & 4
2021
 1st Trofej Umag
 1st Stage 1a Settimana Internazionale di Coppi e Bartali
 6th Gran Piemonte
2022
 Tour of Antalya
1st  Points classification
1st Stage 4
 1st Stage 4 Tour de Langkawi
 2nd Overall ZLM Toer
1st Stage 3
 4th Veenendaal–Veenendaal Classic
2023
 5th Bredene Koksijde Classic

Grand Tour general classification results timeline

References

External links

 
 

1994 births
Living people
Italian male cyclists
Italian people of Polish descent
Cyclists from Brescia
Polish emigrants to Italy
Sportspeople from Podkarpackie Voivodeship
People from Jarosław